Nan'an is a county-level city of southern Fujian province, People's Republic of China. It is under the administration of Quanzhou City and as of 2010, had a total population of 1,500,000. More than 
4,000,000 overseas Chinese trace their ancestry to Nan'an.

History

Nan'an is located on the southeastern coast of Fujian province. It has been the centre of the 3 Wu Kingdoms. Nan'an history dates back 1700 years. Nan'an has been the economic and cultural centre for Minnan people.

Geography and climate 
Nan'an experiences subtropical monsoonal humid climate. It has 349 days which is frost free.

Nan'an is situated below Anxi County, adjacent to Jinjiang to the east and Tong'an District to the West.

Islands in Nan'an include:
 Kui Yu  
 Xiaobai Yu ( or )

Administrative divisions
The city is divided into 3 subdistricts, 21 towns, and 2 townships. The city also contains an economic development zone.

Subdistricts 

Towns 
Guanqiao, Shengxin, Luncang, Dongtian, Yingdu, Xiangyun, Jintao, Shishan, Penghua, Matou, Jiudu, Lefeng, Luodong, Meishan, Honglai, Hongmei , Kangmei, Fengzhou, Xiamei, Shuitou, and Shijing.

Townships 
 and Xiangyang Township.

Economy 

Nan'an is fast developing into an economic and industrial hub for Quanzhou prefecture. Its close proximity to economic centres such as Xiamen, Guangzhou, Fuzhou, Shanghai, Guangzhou and Shenzhen makes it an important investment location for foreign investments and Taiwan businessmen.

Nan'an has very strong rail infrastructure and road links making it a gateway for tourism as well as commerce.

Education 
Schools located in Nan'an include Nan'an Experimental Middle School.

Notable people
 Lee Kong Chian, Singaporean politician and businessman
 Zheng Zhilong, political and military leader in the late Ming dynasty
 Lim Bo Seng, Singaporean hero.
Huang Dongping, 2020 Olympic Champion

Climate

References

External links 

 Nan'an Official Government Website 

 
Cities in Fujian
County-level divisions of Fujian
Quanzhou